The Main road 2 is a south–north direction First class main road in Hungary, that connects Budapest with Parassapuszta, Hont (the border of Slovakia).

The existing route is a main road with two traffic lanes. Most of the traffic was taken over by the M2 expressway.

The road, as well as all other main roads in Hungary, is managed and maintained by Magyar Közút, state owned company.

See also

 Roads in Hungary

Sources

External links

 Hungarian Public Road Non-Profit Ltd. (Magyar Közút Nonprofit Zrt.)
 National Infrastructure Developer Ltd.

Main roads in Hungary
Pest County
Nógrád County